Mara Rekar (born 8 May 1937) is a Slovenian cross-country skier. She competed in the women's 10 kilometres at the 1956 Winter Olympics, representing Yugoslavia.

Cross-country skiing results

Olympic Games

World Championships

References

External links
 

1937 births
Living people
Slovenian female cross-country skiers
Olympic cross-country skiers of Yugoslavia
Cross-country skiers at the 1956 Winter Olympics
People from the Municipality of Kranjska Gora